Arlington West: The Film is a 2006 documentary about the Iraq War by Peter Dudar and Sally Marr. The title refers to Arlington West, the "temporary cemeteries" in Santa Barbara and Santa Monica, California which serve as memorials to those who have been killed in Iraq.

Background
The film features 105 interviews, mostly with young soldiers who have served in Iraq, talking about their experiences there. It also features members of Gold Star Families for Peace, whose sons or daughters died in Iraq. Among these parents are Cindy Sheehan, Fernando Suarez, Jane Bright, Bill Mitchell, Vickie Castro, Nadia McCaffrey, and Karen Meredith.

Endorsements
The film has been notably praised by historian Howard Zinn, U.S. Congressman John Murtha, author Chalmers Johnson, filmmaker Haskell Wexler, and anti-war activists Medea Benjamin and Frank Dorrel.

References

External links
 Official site of Veterans for Peace
 Official site of Arlington West Santa Monica

Documentary films about the Iraq War
2006 films
American documentary films
2006 documentary films
2000s English-language films
2000s American films